Kyllé Hoggart (born 22 May) (stylised as Kylle Hogart) is an Australian actress.

Personal life 
Hoggart was born in Sydney on 22 May and is the oldest out of two daughters; her younger sister, Kellie (born 1 May 1974), was formerly a member of the Teen Queens, an Australian pop group from 1992 to 1993 and an original member of Hi-5, an Australian children's music group aligned with a TV series of the same name from 1998 to 2008 and currently lives in Melbourne.

Her parents, Dennis, a former professional football player (born 2 January 1939 in Glasgow, Scotland), and Sonjie also live in Sydney.

Hoggart currently resides in Los Angeles.

Career 
Hoggart has appeared in more than forty television commercials, both national and international. Hoggart has also co-starred in two Australian television series, The Ferals (1994–95) as Roberta 'Robbie' Henderson and Us and Them (1995) as Donna. Hoggart also co-produced and played a waitress in the film Jesus, Mary and Joey (2003).

In 2008, Hoggart co-hosted US radio girl talk show Females Uncut.

Filmography

Film

Television

References

Australian television actresses
Living people
Year of birth missing (living people)
Australian people of Scottish descent
Australian people of English descent
Australian expatriates in the United States
Actresses from Sydney